Frederick is an unincorporated community in Miami County, in the U.S. state of Ohio.

History
Former variant names of Frederick were Fredericktown and Fidelity. A post office called Fidelity was established in 1849, and remained in operation until 1907. Frederick was named for Frederick Yount, a pioneer settler.

References

Unincorporated communities in Miami County, Ohio
Unincorporated communities in Ohio